Parisa Mollagholi Liljestrand (born 15 March 1983) is a Swedish politician for the Moderate Party. Born to a Kurdish family in Oshnavieh, Iran, she is the Minister of Culture in the Ulf Kristersson cabinet since 18 October 2022.

References

1983 births
Living people
Women government ministers of Sweden
Swedish politicians of Iranian descent
Moderate Party politicians
Swedish politicians of Kurdish descent
Iranian emigrants to Sweden